Borislav Georgiev Milanov (pseudonym: B-OK) is a Bulgarian music composer, songwriter and record producer known for his work on the Eurovision Song Contest. He has collaborated with Alexandra Stan. Milanov is a co-producer of the Bulgarian Eurovision participation in 2017, 2018 and 2020 and the creator of Equinox. He is the founder of the label “Symphonix International”, headquartered in Vienna, Austria.

Eurovision Song Contest
Milanov is the author or co-author of the following Eurovision songs:

Awards
 Marcel Bezencon Awards 2018 - Composer Award for "Bones" - together with Trey Campbell, Joacim Persson and Dag Lundberg.

Personal life
Borislav Milanov was born in Sofia, Bulgaria on 1983. At Eurovision Song Contest 2017 in Kyiv, he met Tamara Gachechiladze, a representative of Georgia. The two got married in 2018. They have two children and live in Vienna.

References

External links
 Borislav Milanov on Discogs
 Borislav Milanov Instagram

1983 births
Bulgarian songwriters
Living people
Bulgarian emigrants to Austria